Andrea Baschirotto is a full professor at the University of Milano-Bicocca, Milano, Italy and a Director of the Microelectronics Group. In 2014 Andrea Baschirotto was named Fellow of the Institute of Electrical and Electronics Engineers (IEEE) "for contributions to analog filters."

References

External links

20th-century births
Living people
Engineers from Milan
Fellow Members of the IEEE
Year of birth missing (living people)
Place of birth missing (living people)